The Priest's Secret (Spanish: El secreto del sacerdote) is a 1941 Mexican drama film directed by Joselito Rodríguez and starring Arturo de Córdova, Alicia de Phillips and Pedro Armendáriz. A Catholic priest is conflicted about informing the police of something he heard in confession.

Cast

 Arturo de Córdova
 Alicia de Phillips
 Pedro Armendáriz
 René Cardona
 Miguel Montemayor
 Víctor Urruchúa
 Manuel Noriega
 Evita Muñoz ("Chachita") as Martita
 Armando Soto La Marina
 Amelia Wilhelmy
 Joaquín Coss
 José Torvay
 Lupe Inclán
 Manuel Buendía
 Humberto Rodríguez

References

Bibliography 
 Daniel Biltereyst &  Daniela Treveri Gennari. Moralizing Cinema: Film, Catholicism, and Power. Routledge, 2014.

External links 
 

1941 films
1941 drama films
Mexican drama films
1940s Spanish-language films
Films directed by Joselito Rodríguez
Mexican black-and-white films
1940s Mexican films